Mykhailo Mykolayovych Horyn (17 June 1930 – 13 January 2013) was a Ukrainian human rights activist, Soviet dissident, and politician. He was a People's Deputy of Ukraine in the first convocation of the Verkhovna Rada, from 15 May 1990 to 10 May 1994. He played an important role in the country's struggle for independence.

Regarding Russian-Ukrainian relations, he said, "Our historical mission is to be the doctor who will cure Russia of its imperial ambition. Ukraine is a European power. Russia is not. It is a Eurasian power. It is sitting on top of the Ural mountains looking East and trying to decide how to tackle its problems".

See also
 Ivan Drach, Ukrainian dissident

References

1930 births
2013 deaths
Ukrainian human rights activists
Ukrainian dissidents
People's Movement of Ukraine politicians
People from Lviv Oblast
Recipients of the Order of Merit (Ukraine), 3rd class
Recipients of the Order of Prince Yaroslav the Wise, 5th class
Soviet human rights activists
Soviet dissidents
Ukrainian Helsinki Group
Chevaliers of the Order For Courage, 1st class